Oleksandr Olehovych Horshkovozov (born 18 July 1991, in Luhansk) is a Ukrainian diver.

Career
He has won two medals at the World Championships (silver at the 2015 World Championship in the team event with Yuliia Prokopchuk, bronze at the 2011 World Championships with Oleksandr Bondar in the men's synchronized 10 metre platform) and eight at the European Championships.

Horshkovozov competed in the men's synchronized 10 metre platform event at the 2012 Summer Olympics, finishing 8th with Oleksandr Bondar, and at the 2016 Summer Olympics in Rio, finishing 6th with Maksym Dolhov.

References

Ukrainian male divers
1991 births
Sportspeople from Luhansk
Living people
Olympic divers of Ukraine
Divers at the 2012 Summer Olympics
Divers at the 2016 Summer Olympics
World Aquatics Championships medalists in diving
Universiade medalists in diving
Universiade gold medalists for Ukraine
21st-century Ukrainian people